This is a list of films produced by the Tollywood (Telugu language film industry) based in Hyderabad in the year 2008.

List of released films

Dubbed films

References 

2008
Telugu
2008 in Indian cinema